Feelings is a 2003 French drama film written by Noémie Lvovsky and Florence Setvos and directed by Lvovsky.

Plot 
François and Edith are newlyweds. François, a new doctor, is offered to take over Jacques' small-town practice. Jacques and his wife Carole offer the newlyweds to rent a small cottage in their property.

The two couples soon form a friendship and soon beautiful young Edith begins a sexual relationship with Jacques. The romance however, is discovered and Edith leaves Jacques to get back to her husband destroying the older couple in the process.

Cast
 Nathalie Baye as Carole
 Jean-Pierre Bacri as Jacques
 Isabelle Carré as Edith
 Melvil Poupaud as François
 Agathe Bonitzer as Sonia
 Virgile Grünberg as Léo
 Valeria Bruni Tedeschi as a young mother

Accolades

References

External links
 

2003 films
2003 drama films
2000s French-language films
French drama films
Films directed by Noémie Lvovsky
Louis Delluc Prize winners
Films produced by Claude Berri
2000s French films